Zinc finger protein ubi-d4 is a protein that in humans is encoded by the DPF2 gene.

The protein encoded by this gene is a member of the d4 domain family, characterized by a zinc finger-like structural motif. This protein functions as a transcription factor which is necessary for the apoptotic response following deprivation of survival factors. It likely serves a regulatory role in rapid hematopoietic cell growth and turnover. This gene is considered a candidate gene for multiple endocrine neoplasia type I, an inherited cancer syndrome involving multiple parathyroid, enteropancreatic, and pituitary tumors.

References

Further reading

External links 
 

Transcription factors